Großes Moor is a lake in the Rostock district in Mecklenburg-Vorpommern, Germany. At an elevation of 81.8 m, its surface area is 0.055 km².

Lakes of Mecklenburg-Western Pomerania